Canalicular adenoma is a benign, epithelial salivary gland neoplasm arranged in interconnecting cords of columnar cells. This is a very rare benign neoplasm, that makes up about 1% of all salivary gland tumors, or about 4% of all benign salivary gland tumors.

Presentation
Most patients present in the 7th decade of life, with females affected much more commonly than males (about a 4:1 ratio). The vast majority of the tumors present in the upper lip, although a few present in the palate or buccal (cheek) tissue as a slowly enlarging mass. It is curious that the tumor may show multifocality or multinodularity, a finding that should not be confused with invasion clinically or with malignancy.

Diagnosis
Tumors are usually small because they come to clinical attention early on in development, with an average size of about 1.6 cm. There is a very characteristic appearance to the tumor when reviewed histologically.  There is a canalicular pattern with cords and ribbons showing connection points between opposing columnar cells within spaces that is called a "string of pearls" appearance.  There are often small luminal squamous balls or morules. There is a very well developed supporting tissue that is a loose, fibrillar stroma, rich in hyaluronic acid and chondroitin sulphate. In a few cases small calcifications or microliths may be present. Although seldom necessary, a pathologist can do immunohistochemistry studies to confirm the diagnosis, with the cells strongly reactive with pancytokeratin, S100 protein and SOX10, with a delicate GFAP reaction around the periphery. Even though it is a benign tumor, it must be separated from a basal cell adenoma, pleomorphic adenoma, adenoid cystic carcinoma, and polymorphous adenocarcinoma.

Treatment
Recurrences are probably more likely to represent multifocal tumors, with conservative surgery the treatment of choice.

References

Oral neoplasia